Wang Ting-son (born 30 June 1965) or Timothy Wang is a Taiwanese politician who served in the Legislative Yuan from 2010 to 2016.

Early life and education
Wang Ting-son's father Wang Ching-feng served as the magistrate of Hualien County between 1993 and 2001. The younger Wang studied mathematics at Soochow University before attending George Washington University in the United States, where he earned a master's and doctoral degree in international business. Wang returned to Taiwan, joining the National Dong Hwa University faculty.

Political career
Wang held several posts within the Kuomintang before he was nominated to contest a by-election scheduled for 27 February 2010, to replace outgoing legislator Fu Kun-chi. Ma Ying-jeou made several appearances at Wang's campaign events, as did King Pu-tsung. Wang faced Democratic Progressive Party candidate Hsiao Bi-khim and independent Shih Sheng-liang. Five days before the election, Wang led Hsiao by thirteen percentage points, and eventually defeated her by approximately six thousand votes, a margin that the Taipei Times considered "narrow" due to Fu Kun-chi's strong influence in Hualien. The Kuomintang renominated Wang for the 2012 legislative elections, and he retained the Hualien County district seat contested by DPP candidate Lie Kuen-cheng. Wang sought reelection to the legislature in 2016, but lost to Hsiao Bi-khim, his political opponent in 2010.

References

1965 births
Living people
Hualien County Members of the Legislative Yuan
Members of the 7th Legislative Yuan
Members of the 8th Legislative Yuan
Kuomintang Members of the Legislative Yuan in Taiwan
Academic staff of the National Dong Hwa University
Soochow University (Taiwan) alumni
George Washington University School of Business alumni